Iñaki Descarga Retegui (born 25 August 1976) is a Spanish former footballer. Mainly a central defender, he could also operate as a right back.

He started and ended his 16-year professional career with Real Unión, but played mainly for Levante (eight seasons and 226 official matches, 61 in La Liga).

Club career
Descarga was born in Irun, Basque Country. After an insignificant stint with CA Osasuna in the second division and a season with neighbours SD Eibar in the same level, he spent eight years with Levante UD, where he would be one of their most influential players as well as captain, helping to two promotions to La Liga. His first match in the competition came on 13 November 2004 in a 0–1 away loss against Deportivo de La Coruña, with the Valencian Community side being relegated on the last matchday.

Following Levante's severe financial crisis during 2007–08, Descarga was one of many players who would leave, joining Legia Warsaw in August 2008 and reuniting with former Osasuna teammate Iñaki Astiz. He made his Ekstraklasa debut in a game against Arka Gdynia (2–2) but, after just 13 minutes on the pitch, he tore his hamstring and never played for the team again, leaving at the end of the campaign.

In July 2009, Descarga signed with his first club Real Unión of Irun, recently promoted to the second tier. On 20 June 2010, as they were immediately relegated, he helped seal their fate by scoring in his own net in a 0–2 home defeat to neighbours Real Sociedad (last matchday).

After not being able to help Unión return to division two, Descarga retired in June 2011 at the age of 35.

Match-fixing controversy
On 3 December 2008, Spanish regional TV channel Popular TV del Mediterráneo released a recording of a telephone conversation between Levante's president, Julio Romero, and club defender Descarga, in which the latter admitted that a certain number of his teammates had accepted a bribe to lose a 17 June 2007 match against Athletic Bilbao. The opposition won 2–0, and RC Celta de Vigo were instead relegated.

References

External links

1976 births
Living people
Sportspeople from Irun
Spanish footballers
Footballers from the Basque Country (autonomous community)
Association football defenders
La Liga players
Segunda División players
Segunda División B players
Real Unión footballers
CA Osasuna B players
CA Osasuna players
SD Eibar footballers
Levante UD footballers
Ekstraklasa players
Legia Warsaw players
Spanish expatriate footballers
Expatriate footballers in Poland
Spanish expatriate sportspeople in Poland